= Constitutional French Monarchy =

Constitutional French Monarchy may refer to:

- Kingdom of the French (1791–1792), the constitutional reign of Louis XVI
- First French Empire (1804–1814, 1815)
- Bourbon Restoration (1814, 1815–1830)
- Kingdom of the French (1830–1848)
- Second French Empire (1852–1870)
